Geraldo Alves may refer to:
 Geraldo Cleofas Dias Alves (1954–1976), Brazilian footballer
 Geraldo Alves (footballer, born 1980), Portuguese retired footballer, nephew of the former
 Geraldo Hauers Alves (1935–1993), Brazilian actor